The Pont Ambroix or Pont d'Ambrussum (French for Ambrussum Bridge) was a 1st-century BC Roman bridge in the south of France which was part of the Via Domitia. It crossed the Vidourle at Ambrussum, between today's Gallargues-le-Montueux in the Gard department and Villetelle in the Hérault department.

In the High Middle Ages, a chapel devoted to St Mary was added to the structure. Today, only one of the original eleven arches remains in the middle of the river.

Ambrussum contains three archaeological sites of international importance: the Colline de Devès which was first occupied in 2300 BC and settled as an oppidum between 300 BC and 100 AD; the Roman staging post on the Via Domitia which had hotels, a baths and industrial buildings; and the Pont Ambroix.

The bridge was sketched by Anne Rulman in 1620 and the drawing shows only four arches. An 1839 lithograph and a painting by Gustave Courbet (1857) show two arches.

The Vidourlades are violent floods on the Vidourle, in which the water flow increases from a minimum of 3 m3/s to over 3000 m3/s. Floods were recorded 8 October 1723. The floods of 18 November 1745 reduced the bridge from four arches to three. Further major floods occurred 6 October 1812, 21 October 1891, 21 September 1907. The floods of 7 September 1933 reduced the bridge from two arches to the one we see today.

The site was abandoned when transit patterns changed; the Via Domitia became less important and the community relocated to Lunel-Viel which better served a north–south transit pattern, but the bridge continued in use until the late Middle Ages.

The bridge is a Mérimée list National Monument No. PA00103057.  The oppidum is Mérimée list National Monument No. PA00103760

See also 
 List of bridges in France
 List of Roman bridges
 Roman architecture
 Roman engineering

Sources

External links 

 
 Painting of the bridge by Gustave Courbet

Roman bridges in France
Deck arch bridges
Stone bridges in France
Bridges completed in the 1st century BC
Buildings and structures in Gard
Buildings and structures in Hérault
Tourist attractions in Gard
Tourist attractions in Hérault
1st-century BC establishments in the Roman Republic